Raj K. Purohit is an Indian politician and a senior member of the Bharatiya Janata Party. He is a six term member of the Maharashtra Legislative Assembly.

Constituency
Raj K. Purohit was elected four times from the Mumbadevi assembly constituency and twice from the Colaba constituency of Mumbai, Maharashtra. He has been a member of the  Maharashtra Legislative Assembly for over twenty five  years.

Positions held 
Maharashtra Legislative Assembly MLA (1990-1995, 1995-1999, 1999-2004, 2004-2009 and 2014-2019).

References 

Bharatiya Janata Party politicians from Maharashtra
Maharashtra MLAs 2014–2019
Living people
Marathi politicians
Year of birth missing (living people)